This is the list of theatres located in Estonia. The list is incomplete.

References 

 
Estonia
Theatres